Caland may refer to:

 Caland system, a set of rules in the reconstructed Proto-Indo-European language
 the East–West line of the Rotterdam Metro, formerly named Caland Line for Pieter Caland
 SBM Offshore, formerly IHC Caland, Dutch-based group of companies selling systems to the offshore oil and gas industry

People with the surname
 Elisabeth Caland (born 1862), German pianist, piano pedagogue and theorist of keyboard technique
 Huguette Caland (born 1931), daughter of the first Lebanese president after the independence
 Pierre Caland (born 1956), French freestyle swimmer
 Pieter Caland (1826–1902), Dutch civil engineer
 Willem Caland (1859–1952), Dutch Indologist

See also
 
 Calanda (disambiguation)